Benedict Mor Gregorios (1 February 1916 – 10 October 1994) was the second metropolitan archbishop of the Syro-Malankara Catholic Church.

Life
Gregorios or "Thangalathil Thirumeni" was born and raised in the Malankara Orthodox Church in Kalloopara, present day Pathanamthitta district. He was baptised by the name Varghese Thangalathil.He belonged to the "Thangalathil" branch of the Kaliyankal family one of the 4  ancient brahmin families baptised by St. Thomas the apostle As a teenage boy Varghese came closer to the ideal of Bethany Ashram. He was attracted by the personality of Geevarghese Ivanios and later became a member of Bethany Ashram and  adopted the name Benedict. He studied philosophy and theology at Papal Seminary, Kandy, Sri Lanka. He was ordained a religious priest of Bethany Ashram by then Bishop of Kandy Bernad Reinjo in 1944. As a dynamic young priest he taught Syriac for some time in St. Aloysius Seminary, Trivandrum. He was sent for higher studies in economics to St. Joseph's College, Trichy (1946–1949). He became the first principal of Mar Ivanios College.

He was consecrated as bishop on January 29, 1953, by the hands of Archbishop Ivanios, and he received the name Benedict Mar Gregorios. After the death of Ivanios, Gregorios became the second metropolitan archbishop of the Syro-Malankara Catholic Church in 1955. Parish communities were formed in Syro-Malankara Catholic Church during this period. Gregorios paved the way to establish Mar Theophilos Training College, Trivandrum and Mar Gregorios College of Arts and Science, Chennai. After 41 years of episcopal ministry, Gregorios died on 10 October 1994. His body was entombed in St. Mary's Cathedral, Pattom, Trivandrum.

St. John's College, Anchal, a first grade arts and science college in Kollam district was established by Gregorios. St. John's College Anchal became the nerve centre of the total development of a remote rural village into a fast developing township.

References

Sources 
Thomas Inchaykkalodi, Archbishop Mar Ivanios, Vol. 1, Bethany Publications, Kottayam, 2006.

External links

"Syro-Malankara Catholic Church – homepage"
Syro-Malankara Catholic Church – alternative site built by Malankarites
Malankara Catholic Church UK

1916 births
1994 deaths
Converts to Eastern Catholicism from Oriental Orthodoxy
20th-century Eastern Catholic bishops
Syro-Malankara bishops
Burials at the Cathedral of Saint Mary, Pattom
Christian clergy from Kerala